District of Columbia Routes are numbered highways maintained by District of Columbia's District Department of Transportation (DDOT). In addition to these routes, there are several Interstate and United States Numbered Highways that pass through Washington, D.C. The metro area is also served by three unnumbered, federally maintained, parkways: the Clara Barton Parkway, the Rock Creek and Potomac Parkway, and the George Washington Memorial Parkway (the latter on the west side of the Potomac River, but a portion of it is east of the Boundary Channel).

List of routes
The chart below consists of all District of Columbia Routes, including signed routes that no longer traverse the District of Columbia.

See also

References

External links
District Department of Transportation
Washington, D.C. Highways at AARoads

Numbered highways